This is a list of country codes on UK issued diplomatic vehicle registration plates, i.e. the first group of three numbers.

Since 1979, motor vehicles operated by foreign embassies, high commissions, consulates and international organisations have been issued unique vehicle registration marks with a distinguishing format of three numbers, space, letter D or X, space and three numbers. The letter D is predominantly used for vehicles operated in or around the capital of London with the letter X allocated to vehicles outside London and for international organisations, unless otherwise specified by bilateral treaty or arrangement.

The first group of three numbers identifies the country or international organisation. The second group of three numbers is a serial number sequence starting at 101 for diplomats, 400 for non-diplomatic staff of international organisations, and 700 upwards for consular or other non-diplomatic staff.

Eligible officials are required to be accredited by the Foreign & Commonwealth Office (FCO) who liaise with Specialist Registrations at the Driver & Vehicle Licensing Agency (DVLA) for issuance. Guidance document INF267 (4/18) has been produced by the DVLA for accredited officials.

Honorary consuls are not entitled under UK law to diplomatic vehicle registrations and/or driving permits.

Embassies, high commissions, consulates and international organisations

References

External links
 Driver and Vehicle Licensing Agency homepage

Country codes on British diplomatic car number plates
Diplomatic car number plates
Foreign relations of the United Kingdom
Diplomatic license plates
Country codes on British diplomatic car number plates